Guttersrud Station is a railway station located in Fetsund in Fet, Norway on the Kongsvinger Line. The station was built in 1932. The station is served hourly, with extra rush hour departures, by the Oslo Commuter Rail line R14 operated by Vy.

30. jul. 2012 - Guttersrud has been closed for several years. This is due to the construction of the new station at Roven. After building a new station at Roven, Guttersrud would be located between to signals in a way not allowed according to regulations. Many attempts from locals failed to save the station. Passengers are requested to use Sørumsand or Svingen. 

Railway stations in Fet
Railway stations on the Kongsvinger Line
Railway stations opened in 1932
1932 establishments in Norway